The 2011 Roll Ball World Cup was the first World Cup of the game Roll Ball. It was held at the Shree Shiv Chhatrapati Sports Complex in Pune. It was won by Denmark, a non-member of the International Roll Ball Federation, and host India placed second. The Cup had 28 group stage matches, 2 semi-finals and a final. There were 31 matches in total. 

Tanzania from Africa; Belgium, Belarus, Denmark, Netherlands and Sweden from Europe were the six non-members of International Rollball Federation participating in this World Cup.

Participating teams 

There were 16 national roll ball teams:

Africa (3)
  Kenya.
  Tanzania.
  Uganda.

Asia (7)
  Bangladesh.
  China.
  Hong Kong.
  India. (Host)
  Malaysia.
  Nepal.
  United Arab Emirates.

Europe (6)
  Belgium.
  Belarus.
  Denmark. (Champions)
  Great Britain.
  Netherlands.
  Sweden.

Matches 

17 April 2011.

  India vs  Kenya.
  Denmark vs  Bangladesh.
  Great Britain vs  Hong Kong.
  Netherlands vs  Malaysia.

18 April 2011.

  Belarus vs  Nepal.
  China vs  Belgium.
  Denmark vs  Belgium.
  Great Britain vs  Tanzania.
  Netherlands vs  Malaysia.
  India vs  Sweden.
  Netherlands vs  Nepal.
  Uganda vs  Tanzania.

19 April 2011.

  Bangladesh vs  China.
  Denmark vs  China.
  Great Britain vs  Uganda.
  Hong Kong vs  Uganda.
  India vs  United Arab Emirates.
  Kenya vs  United Arab Emirates.
  Malaysia vs  Belarus.
  Netherlands vs  Belarus.

20 April 2011.

  Bangladesh vs  Tanzania.
  Belarus vs  Uganda.
  Denmark vs  United Arab Emirates.
  Hong Kong vs  Tanzania.
  India vs  Belgium.
  Malaysia vs  Nepal.
  Nepal vs  Great Britain.
  Sweden vs  Kenya.

21 April 2011.

 Visit day

22 April 2011.

 Semi-final 1 India vs  Nepal
 Semi-final 2 Denmark vs  Belarus
 Final Denmark vs  India

See also
Maha Roll Ball League

References 

Rollball
2011 in Indian sport
International sports competitions hosted by India